Mahīdhara ("earth-bearing") was a 16th-century commentator of the Vedas. His treatises include the Mantramahodadhi ("great ocean of mantras") of ca. 1588, and the Vedadipa (veda-dīpa, "light of the Vedas"). The latter concerns the Vajasaneyi-samhita of the White Yajurveda.

Mahīdhara's namesake is a legendary mountain described in the Mahabharata, which is also an epithet of Vishnu.

The commentaries of Mahīdhara belong to a time later than Yaska.

Editions
Mantramahodadhi with the Commentary Nauka, Sri Satguru Publications, Indian Books Centre, Delhi (1984, 1985), .
Mahidhara's Mantra mahodadhih: Text in Sanskrit and roman along with English translation and comprehensive commentary, Prachya Prakashan (1992)
Isavasyopanisad bhasya sangraha: Sankara bhasyam, Uvata bhasyam, Sayana bhasyam, Mahidhara bhasyam, Prakasa bhasyam, Yogapaksiyam Pra. Bha., Svami Dayananda,  Jagadisa Samskrta Pustakalaya; Nutana samskarana edition (2001), 
A. Weber, The Vajasaneyi-samhita in the Madhyandina- and the Kanva-shakha Berlin (1852), reprint Chowkhamba (1972).

See also
Sayana
Uvata
Yaska

References 
 Saraswati, Dayanand. "An Introduction to the Commentary on the Vedas Rigvedadi Bhashya Bhumika by Dayanand Saraswati, Ghasi Ram — Reviews, Discussion, Bookclubs, Lists". Goodreads.com. Retrieved 2014-04-19.
 https://archive.org/details/RigvedaWww.aryamantavya.in/page/n1 
 Dayananda Sarasvati, S., Parmanand, 1. (1981) : Pg xxii Mahīdhara
Rigvedadi Bhashya Bhumika

Specific

16th-century Indian scholars
Indian Vedic scholars
Indian Sanskrit scholars